Zhang Gongyao (Chinese: 张功耀; Pinyin: Zhāng Gōngyào; born November 10, 1956) is a Chinese philosopher. He is a professor in Department of Philosophy, Central South University, China. He promoted the abolishment of traditional Chinese medicine.

Biography
Zhang was born in Chenzhou, Hunan in 1956.  He received his M.A degree from Zhejiang University in 1988. In 2006, Zhang initiated a movement to call for abolishment of the traditional Chinese medicine.

References

External links
 Profile of Zhang Gongyao at the official website of Central South University
 News related to Zhang Gongyao's movement of banning Traditional Chinese Medicine
 Idea to abolish traditional Chinese medicine rebuked

1956 births
Living people
Academic staff of the Central South University
Educators from Hunan
People from Chenzhou
People's Republic of China philosophers
Philosophers from Hunan